Kodwo Sam Annan was a Ghanaian politician. He served as a member of parliament for the Asikuma constituency from 1965 to 1966.
Upon his return from his studies in United Kingdom in 1960, he was appointed regional secretary for the Convention People's Party.

See also
 List of MPs elected in the 1965 Ghanaian parliamentary election

References

Ghanaian MPs 1965–1966
Convention People's Party (Ghana) politicians
20th-century Ghanaian politicians